Somerset Railroad may refer to:
Somerset Railroad (New York), operated by CSX Transportation to serve a power plant near Buffalo
Somerset Railroad (Maine), predecessor of the Maine Central Railroad, branching from the main line near Waterville